The Fairey Firefly is a Second World War-era carrier-borne fighter aircraft and anti-submarine aircraft that was principally operated by the Fleet Air Arm (FAA). It was developed and built by the British aircraft manufacturer Fairey Aviation Company.

Development of the Firefly can be traced back to pair of specifications issued by the British Air Ministry in 1938, calling for new naval fighter designs. Designed to the contemporary FAA concept of a two-seat fleet reconnaissance/fighter, the pilot and observer were positioned at separate stations. In flight, the Firefly was superior in terms of both performance and firepower to its predecessor, the Fairey Fulmar. Due to a protracted development, the type only entered operational service towards the end of the conflict, at which point it was no longer competitive as a fighter. The limitations of a single engine in a relatively heavy airframe reduced its performance, but the Firefly proved to be a fairly sturdy, long-ranged, and docile aircraft during carrier operations.

The Fairey Firefly served in the Second World War as a fleet fighter. During the post-war era, it was soon superseded in the fighter role by the arrival of more modern jet aircraft, thus the Firefly was adapted to perform in other roles, including strike operations and anti-submarine warfare. In these capacities, it remained a mainstay of the FAA until the mid-1950s. Both British and Australian Fireflies routinely performed ground–attack operations from various aircraft carriers during the Korean War. In foreign service, the type was in operation with the naval air arms of Australia, Canada, India and the Netherlands. As late as 1962, Dutch Fireflies were used to carry out attack sorties against Indonesian infiltrators in Dutch New Guinea. Its final uses were in various secondary roles, such as trainers, target tugs and drone aircraft.

Design and development
During 1938, by which point British authorities were preparing for the likelihood of a major conflict, the Air Ministry issued a pair of specifications calling for naval fighters, a conventional and a "turret fighter". This aircraft would replace the Fairey Fulmar, which had been viewed as an interim design. These specifications were updated during the following year, while several British manufacturers tendered their ideas. Further changes to the official specification followed, such as the turret fighter specification being eliminated entirely, while a modified specification was issued to cover single and dual-seat fighters capable of  respectively. Fairey offered designs that could accommodate either a single or twin-seat arrangements, either powered by the Rolls-Royce Griffon engine, or combining a larger airframe with a Napier Sabre engine. After consideration of the manufacturer's responses, Specification N.5/40 replaced the earlier specifications. Due to the necessity of navigating over open sea, it was decided to opt for a two-seater aircraft alone. For defence of naval bases, a separate single seater design would lead to the Blackburn Firebrand.

The Firefly was designed by a team led by H.E. Chaplin at Fairey Aviation which reportedly used the Fulmar as a starting point. During June 1940, the Admiralty placed an initial order for 200 aircraft "off the drawing board", the first three of which were to function as prototypes. On 22 December 1941, the first prototype of the Firefly performed its maiden flight.

The Firefly was a low-wing cantilever monoplane, featuring an oval-section metal semi-monocoque fuselage and a conventional tail unit with forward-placed tailplane. It was powered by a Rolls-Royce Griffon liquid-cooled piston engine, which drove a four-blade Rotol-built propeller. A large chin-mounted radiator was present to provide cooling for the engine. The Firefly had retractable main undercarriage and tail wheel, the hydraulically-actuated main landing gear retracting inwards into the underside of the wing centre-section. This undercarriage was widely-set, a highly useful feature for carrier landings. The aircraft was also fitted with a retractable arrester hook mounted underneath the rear fuselage. The pilot's cockpit was located above the leading edge of the wing while the observer/radio-operator/navigator was positioned aft of the wing's trailing edge. These positions provided better visibility for operating and landing, and both crew were provided with separate jettisonable canopies.

The Firefly was equipped with an all-metal wing which could be folded manually, the wings ending up along the sides of the fuselage when folded. When in the flying position, the wings were hydraulically locked in place. The wing itself featured square tips and large Fairey-Youngman flaps, which provided relatively good handling while flown at low speeds. A total of four 20mm cannon were buried within the wings, which was considered to be relatively heavy armament for the era. According to pilots, the general handling of the Firefly was relatively well-balanced, but a level of physical strength was required to effectively execute aerobatics.

During 1942, handling and performance trials were first undertaken at RAF Boscombe Down by Admiralty test pilots Mike Lithgow and Roy Sydney Baker-Falkner. By 1944, the Firefly had been cleared to use underwing rocket projectiles and, by April 1944, tests involving a double-underwing load of 16 rockets and a pair of  drop tanks still provided acceptable handling. Further testing with two 90 gallon (410 L) drop tanks or two  bombs deemed acceptable albeit with "...a small adverse effect on handling..." while "...handling with a single  bomb was unpleasant, but manageable."

Operational history

The primary variant of the aircraft used during the Second World War was the Firefly Mk I, which was used in all theatres of operations. During March 1943, the first Firefly Mk Is were delivered to the FAA but these did not enter operational service until July 1944, at which point they equipped 1770 Naval Air Squadron aboard . The first operations were flown in the European theatre where Fireflies carried out numerous armed reconnaissance flights and anti-shipping strikes along the Norwegian coast. That year, Fireflies also provided air cover and aerial reconnaissance during attacks on the German battleship .

Throughout its operational career, the Firefly took on increasingly demanding roles from fighter to anti-submarine warfare while being stationed mainly with the British Pacific Fleet in the Far East and Pacific theatres. The type was used against Japanese ground targets and fighter aircraft. FAA Fireflies carried out attacks on oil refineries and airfields and was repeatedly dispatched against Japanese-controlled islands up until Victory over Japan Day. The Firefly gained a level of public renown when the type became the first British-designed and -built aircraft to overfly the Japanese capital of Tokyo.

During May 1945, in anticipation of a major naval offensive against the Japanese mainland, the Canadian government accepted a British offer to loan a pair of Colossus-class aircraft carriers to the Royal Canadian Navy. To equip these carriers, it was necessary to procure naval fighters. Based upon the feedback of veteran pilots, Canada opted to acquire the Firefly over opposition that favoured procuring American aircraft instead. As a stop-gap measure, Royal Navy Fireflies were loaned while more advanced purpose-built aircraft were being constructed. Between 1946 and 1954, the Canadian Navy employed 65  AS Mk.5 Fireflies on its aircraft carriers. The service also flew a handful of Mk.I Fireflies. During the 1950s, Canada decided to sell off its Fireflies and buyers included the armed forces of Ethiopia, Denmark, and the Netherlands.

After the Second World War, the Firefly remained in front line service with the Fleet Air Arm, continuing in this capacity until the mid-1950s. During this time, British-built Fireflies were also supplied to a number of overseas nations, including Canada, Australia, Denmark, Ethiopia, the Netherlands, India and Thailand.

During 1947, the Australian government approved of formation of the Royal Australian Fleet Air Arm and the acquisition of a pair of s from Britain. Following a consultation with the Royal Navy, the Royal Australian Navy (RAN) opted to procure both the Firefly and the Hawker Sea Fury to equip its new aircraft carriers. These two types formed the backbone of the newly formed Australian Carrier Air Groups (CAGs), which would operate a total fleet size of 108 Fireflies, acquired across multiple orders. The first aircraft was delivered in May 1949, and the final Firefly arrived during August 1953. aircrew training predominated in early RAN operations ahead of achieving operational status during 1950.

During the Korean War of the 1950s, both British and Australian Fireflies carried out anti-shipping patrols and ground strikes from various aircraft carriers positioned offshore. Additional missions roles including anti-submarine patrols and aerial observation, as well as assisting battleships in providing effective naval gunfire support. Numerous FAA Fireflies were loaned to the Australian Navy during the conflict as many of its aircraft did not feature cannons when configured for anti-submarine warfare. Despite several incidents of aircraft being struck by anti-aircraft fire, the Firefly proved to be relatively rugged. The type was routinely used for strike operations against targets such as bridges and railway lines to damage North Korean logistics and communications. As the war went on, pilots developed new low-level dive-bombing techniques to achieve greater accuracy. Combat use of the Firefly in the theatre continued until the signing of the Korean Armistice Agreement on 27 July 1953, although post-armistice patrols involving the type continued for several years afterwards.

FAA Fireflies were again deployed in the Far East amid the Malayan Emergency, where it was used conduct to ground-attack operations against Malayan Communist Party insurgents. The Firefly's front line career with the FAA came to an end shortly following the introduction of the newer and larger Fairey Gannet, which effectively replaced the type. The RAN also decided to relegate their Fireflies to secondary duties following the adoption of newer aircraft, such as the Gannet and the jet-powered de Havilland Sea Venom. Several versions of the type were developed later in its career to serve in a number of secondary roles, including as trainers, target tugs and drone aircraft. As an example, the Indian Navy acquired a batch of 10 aircraft during the mid-1950s for target tug purposes. By the end of the 1950s, many operators were disposing of their remaining Fireflies, typically as scrap.

In the late 1940s, the Royal Netherlands Navy deployed a Firefly squadron to the Dutch East Indies, as part of the forces countering Indonesian nationalists. When talks broke down in July 1947, the Dutch launched multiple air strikes. Three Fireflies were shot down by ground fire. During 1960, in response to territorial demands and threats issued by Indonesia, the Netherlands chose to deploy a number of Firefly AS.Mk 4s to Dutch New Guinea. As Indonesian forces began to retake the territory, the Fireflies carried out attack operations during early 1962. These strikes continued until the Royal Netherlands Navy withdrew following a political settlement was negotiated between the two countries.

Variants
 Firefly I / FR.I
 Two variants of the Mk I Firefly were built; 429 "fighter" "Firefly F Mk I"s, built by Fairey and General Aircraft Ltd, and 376 "fighter/reconnaissance" Firefly "FR Mk I"s (which were fitted with the ASH detection radar). The last 334 Mk Is built were upgraded with the  Griffon XII engine.

 Firefly NF.Mk II
 Only 37 Mk II Fireflies were built, all of which were night fighter Firefly NF Mk IIs. They had a slightly longer fuselage than the Mk I and had modifications to house their airborne interception (AI) radar.
 Firefly NF.Mk I
 The NF.II was superseded by the Firefly NF Mk I "night fighter" variant.
 Firefly T.Mk 1
 Twin-cockpit pilot training aircraft. Post-war conversion of the Firefly Mk I.
 Firefly T.Mk 2
 Twin-cockpit armed operational training aircraft. Post-war conversion of the Firefly Mk I.
 Firefly T.Mk 3
 Used for Anti-submarine warfare training of observers. Postwar conversion of the Firefly Mk I.
 Firefly TT.Mk I
 Postwar, a small number of Firefly Mk Is were converted into target tug aircraft.
 Firefly Mk III
 Proposal based on the Griffon 61 engine, but never entered production.
 Firefly Mk IV
 The Firefly Mk IV was equipped with the  Griffon 72 engine and first flew in 1944, but did not enter service until after the end of the war.
 Firefly FR.Mk 4
 Fighter-reconnaissance version based on the Firefly Mk IV.
 Firefly Mk 5

 Firefly NF.Mk 5
 Night fighter version based on the Firefly Mk 5.
 Firefly FR.Mk 5
 Fighter-reconnaissance version based on the Firefly Mk 5.
 Firefly AS.Mk 5
 The later Firefly AS.Mk 5 was an anti-submarine aircraft, which carried American sonobuoys and equipment.
 Firefly Mk 6

 Firefly AS.Mk 6
 The Fairefly AS.Mk 6 was an anti-submarine aircraft, which carried British equipment.
 Firefly TT.Mk 4/5/6
 Small numbers of AS.4/5/6s were converted into target tug aircraft.
 Firefly AS.Mk 7
 The Firefly AS.Mk 7 was an anti-submarine aircraft, powered by a Rolls-Royce Griffon 59 piston engine.
 Firefly T.Mk 7
 The Firefly T.Mk 7 was an interim ASW training aircraft.
 Firefly U.Mk 8
 The Firefly U.Mk 8 was a target drone aircraft; 34 Firefly T.7s were diverted on the production line for completion as target drones.
 Firefly U.Mk 9
 The Firefly U.Mk 9 was a target drone aircraft; 40 existing Firefly Mk AS.4 and AS.5 aircraft were converted to this role.

Operators
Second World War

 Royal Navy – Fleet Air Arm

Postwar

 Royal Australian Navy – Fleet Air Arm
 No. 723 Squadron RAN
 No. 724 Squadron RAN
 No. 725 Squadron RAN
 No. 816 Squadron RAN
 No. 817 Squadron RAN
 No. 851 Squadron RAN
 Royal Australian Air Force
 Aircraft Research and Development Unit (Firefly T.5 VX373 for trials 1953)

 Royal Canadian Navy
 825 Squadron RCN
 826 Squadron RCN
 10 Heavier-than-air Experimental Air Squadron (VX-10) RCN

 Royal Danish Air Force

 Ethiopian Air Force

 Royal Netherlands Navy
 Dutch Naval Aviation Service
 VSQ-1
 VSQ-2
 VSQ-4
 VSQ-5
 VSQ-7
 VSQ-860

 Indian Navy
 Indian Naval Air Arm operated Fireflies from 1955 onwards for target tugging.

 Svensk Flygtjänst AB at Bromma Airport operated 19 TT.1 aircraft between 31 January 1949 and 17 October 1963.

 Royal Thai Air Force operated Fireflies between 1952 and 1966.
 Royal Thai Navy

Royal Navy – Fleet Air Arm operated Fireflies in the anti-submarine role until 1956 when front line aircraft were replaced by the Fairey Gannet.

 700 Naval Air Squadron
 703 Naval Air Squadron
 706 Naval Air Squadron
 719 Naval Air Squadron
 723 Naval Air Squadron
 724 Naval Air Squadron
 725 Naval Air Squadron
 728B Naval Air Squadron
 730 Naval Air Squadron
 731 Naval Air Squadron
 732 Naval Air Squadron
 736 Naval Air Squadron
 737 Naval Air Squadron
 741 Naval Air Squadron
 744 Naval Air Squadron
 746 Naval Air Squadron
 748 Naval Air Squadron
 750 Naval Air Squadron
 751 Naval Air Squadron
 759 Naval Air Squadron
 764 Naval Air Squadron
 765 Naval Air Squadron
 766 Naval Air Squadron
 767 Naval Air Squadron
 768 Naval Air Squadron
 771 Naval Air Squadron
 772 Naval Air Squadron
 778 Naval Air Squadron
 780 Naval Air Squadron
 781 Naval Air Squadron
 782 Naval Air Squadron
 783 Naval Air Squadron
 784 Naval Air Squadron
 790 Naval Air Squadron
 792 Naval Air Squadron
 794 Naval Air Squadron
 795 Naval Air Squadron
 796 Naval Air Squadron
 798 Naval Air Squadron
 799 Naval Air Squadron
 804 Naval Air Squadron
 805 Naval Air Squadron
 810 Naval Air Squadron
 812 Naval Air Squadron
 813 Naval Air Squadron
 814 Naval Air Squadron
 816 Naval Air Squadron
 817 Naval Air Squadron
 820 Naval Air Squadron
 821 Naval Air Squadron
 822 Naval Air Squadron
 824 Naval Air Squadron
 825 Naval Air Squadron
 826 Naval Air Squadron
 827 Naval Air Squadron
 837 Naval Air Squadron
 851 Naval Air Squadron
 860 Naval Air Squadron
 861 Naval Air Squadron
 880 Naval Air Squadron
 882 Naval Air Squadron
 1770 Naval Air Squadron
 1771 Naval Air Squadron
 1772 Naval Air Squadron
 1790 Naval Air Squadron
 1791 Naval Air Squadron
 1792 Naval Air Squadron
 1830 Squadron RNVR
 1840 Squadron RNVR
 1841 Squadron RNVR
 1842 Squadron RNVR
 1843 Squadron RNVR
 1844 Squadron RNVR

Surviving aircraft

There are approximately 24 Fairey Fireflies surviving worldwide, including three airworthy examples and at least one other being restored to flying condition. The Fleet Air Arm Museum possesses two Fireflies, the latest acquisition arriving in 2000 from the Imperial War Museum Duxford. Firefly WB271 was destroyed in July 2003 during an aerobatic air display at the Imperial War Museum in Duxford, Cambridgeshire – Europe's largest display of vintage warplanes. There are two airworthy Fireflies at present:
 AS 6 WH632, which was damaged in a crash and has since been restored to flying condition (painted as an RCN Firefly AS 5), is at the Canadian Warplane Heritage Museum (Canada).<ref>“Details for the Fairey Firefly Mk.IV.” warplane.com’’, Retrieved: 5 October 2021.</ref>

 AS 6 WB518, another former RAN machine, now in the USA. (Damaged at the Wings Over Gillespie Airshow in June 2012, with restoration to airworthiness completed).WB518 was one of the first 10 Mk 6s built, but retained the earlier Mk 5 fuselage. It was originally delivered to the Royal Australian Navy's 817 Squadron and then served in 816 Squadron before being retired and ending up as a memorial on a pole in Griffith, New South Wales, Australia. WB518 was then purchased by American Eddie Kurdziel, a Northwest Airlines captain and former U.S. Navy pilot. WD518 was extensively restored and made its first public appearance at Oshkosh in 2002. Restoration of WD518 used parts salvaged from WD828 which was written off after a crash into a cabbage field in Camden, New South Wales in 1987.WB518 as of July 2015 was then undergoing extensive rebuilding and is now in flying condition out of Gillespie Field, El Cajon, California.

Other survivors include – in Australia:
 AS 5 VX388 is owned by the currently closed to public access Camden Museum of Aviation at Harrington Park, New South Wales.
 AS 6 WD826 is displayed at the Royal Australian Navy's Fleet Air Arm Museum (Australia). This Firefly was restored to airworthy condition in the 1980s and flew for three years before its return to the museum.
 AS 6 WD827 which was once owned by the Australian Air League, Blacktown, New South Wales, is now on display in the Australian National Aviation Museum, Melbourne, Victoria.
 AS 6 WD828 is displayed on a pole outside the Returned Services Leagues Club in Griffith, Australia. It has been repainted as WB518 which was the original aircraft displayed in Griffith but is now the flying example restored by Captain Kurdziel. The swap was made in 1991.
 AS 6 WJ109 is stored for eventual exhibition at the Australian War Memorial, Canberra. This aircraft was previously at the Fleet Air Arm Museum (Australia), Nowra, New South Wales.

The Royal Thai Air Force Museum in Bangkok, Thailand has a Firefly Mk I on display.

A sole remaining Firefly of the 10 acquired by India is displayed at the Naval Aviation Museum in Goa.

Two ex-Swedish Fireflies moved to IWM Duxford, Cambridgeshire in 2003. Acquired by the Aircraft Restoration Company, they were in Royal Navy service from 1944 and 1946, and then converted to target tugs for gunnery training in 1950 and 1954. One is being restored to flying condition, and the other was traded to the Aviodrome Museum in the Netherlands for a Spitfire.

As well as the Canadian Warplane Heritage's ex-Australian Firefly, two other Fireflies are known to exist in Canada: one is at the Canada Aviation and Space Museum in Ottawa and another is being restored at the Shearwater Aviation Museum at Eastern Passage (near Dartmouth), Nova Scotia. Both are Mk I models that served in the Canadian Navy from 1946 to 1954, after which they were sold to the Ethiopian Air Force. Following their discovery in the Ethiopian desert in 1993, they were repatriated to Canada in exchange for medical supplies.

AS 6 WD833, another ex-Australian Firefly, is owned by Henry "Butch" Schroeder who moved the aircraft to Danville, Illinois, USA for restoration. The present whereabouts of this aircraft are unclear.

Specifications (Mk.4 / Mk.5 / Mk.6)

See also

References
Citations

Bibliography
 Bridgman, Leonard. Jane's Fighting Aircraft of World War II. New York: Crescent Books, 1988. .
 Brown, Eric, CBE, DCS, AFC, RN., William Green and Gordon Swanborough. "Fairey Firefly". Wings of the Navy, Flying Allied Carrier Aircraft of World War Two. London: Jane's Publishing Company, 1980, pp. 145–157. .
 Bishop, Chris. The Encyclopedia of Weapons of World War II., Sterling Publishing Company, 2002. .
 Bishop, Chris and Soph Moeng, ed. The Aerospace Encyclopedia of Air Warfare, Vol. 2: 1945 to the Present (World Air Power Journal). London: AIRtime Publishing, 1997. .
 Bussy, Geoffrey. Fairey Firefly: F.Mk.1 to U.Mk.9 (Warpaint Series 28). Milton Keynes, UK: Hall Park Books Ltd., 2001. .
 Buttler, Tony. Blackburn Firebrand – Warpaint Number 56. Denbigh East, Bletchley, UK: Warpaint Books Ltd., 2000.
 Buttler, Tony. British Secret Projects: Fighters & Bombers 1935–1950. Hinckley, UK: Midland Publishing, 2004. .
 Fredriksen, John C. International Warbirds: An Illustrated Guide to World Military Aircraft, 1914–2000. ABC-CLIO, 2001. .
 Harrison, William A. Fairey Firefly – The Operational Record. Shrewsbury, UK: Airlife, 1992.  .
 Harrison, William A. Fairey Firefly in Action (Aircraft number 200). Carrollton, Texas: Squadron/Signal Publications Inc., 2006. .
 Mason, Tim. The Secret Years: Flight Testing at Boscombe Down 1939–1945. Manchester, UK: Hikoki, 1998. .
 Pigott, Peter. On Canadian Wings: A Century of Flight. Dundurn, 2005. .
 Smith, Peter C. Dive Bomber!: Aircraft, Technology, and Tactics in World War II. Stackpole Books, 2008. 
 Thetford, Owen. British Naval Aircraft since 1912. London: Putnam, Fourth edition, 1978. .
 Thomas, Graham. Furies and Fireflies over Korea: The Story of the Men and Machines of the Fleet Air Arm, RAF and Commonwealth Who Defended South Korea 1950–1953. London: Grub Street, 2004. .
 White, Ian. "Nocturnal and Nautical: Fairey Firefly Night-fighters". Air Enthusiast No. 107, September/October 2003. pp. 60–65. 
 Wilson, Stewart. Sea Fury, Firefly and Sea Venom in Australian Service. Weston Creek, ACT, Australia: Aerospace Publications, 1993. .

External links

 Video of Fairey Firefly Mk 5 taxiing at an airshow
 Shearwater Aviation Museum Firefly restoration 
 Warbird Registry – Fairey Firefly
 "Royal Navy's Firefly Is a Deadly Fighter-Scout." Popular Mechanics'', February 1945, p. 11.

Conventional landing gear
1940s British fighter aircraft
Carrier-based aircraft
Single-engined tractor aircraft
Low-wing aircraft
Firefly
1940s British anti-submarine aircraft
Aircraft first flown in 1941
World_War_II_British_fighter_aircraft